Castle Rock (IPA:[ˈkʰʲɾʲekˈaˈxaʃtʰʲɪl]) is a volcanic plug in the middle of Edinburgh upon which Edinburgh Castle sits. The rock is estimated to have formed some 350 million years ago during the early Carboniferous period. It is the remains of a volcanic pipe which cut through the surrounding sedimentary rock, before cooling to form very hard dolerite, a coarser-grained equivalent of basalt. Subsequent glacial erosion was resisted more by the dolerite, which protected the softer rock to the east, leaving a crag and tail formation.

This means that the only readily accessible route to the castle lies to the east, where the ridge slopes more gently. The defensive advantage of such a site is clear, but the geology of the rock also presents difficulties, since basalt is an extremely poor aquifer.

References

External links

Carboniferous volcanoes
Hills of Edinburgh
Volcanic plugs of Scotland